A soapbox is a raised platform from which a speech is delivered.

Soapbox may also refer to:

 Soapbox (car), a type of motorless vehicle 
 MSN Soapbox, an Internet video service
 Soapbox (the Crookes album), released in 2014
 Soapbox, a channel of the Maffick web platform